Zaki Osman (1932 – 14 November 2014) was an Egyptian footballer who played for Zamalek and Ahly, He also played for the Egypt national team, Zaki Osman nicknamed (Coach's Sheikh).

Honours

Player
Ahly
 Egyptian Premier League: 1951–52
 Egypt Cup: 1951–52

Head coach
Zamalek
 Egyptian Premier League: 1977–78
 Egypt Cup: 1976–77

References

2014 deaths
Footballers from Cairo
Egyptian footballers
Egypt international footballers
Zamalek SC players
Yemen national football team managers
Al-Wasl F.C. managers
Zamalek SC managers
Egyptian Premier League players
Association footballers not categorized by position
Egyptian football managers
Expatriate football managers in Saudi Arabia
Expatriate football managers in Yemen
Al Nassr FC managers
Al-Shaab CSC managers
Saudi Professional League managers
Egyptian expatriate football managers
Egyptian expatriate sportspeople in Yemen
Egyptian expatriate sportspeople in Saudi Arabia
Egyptian expatriate sportspeople in the United Arab Emirates
Expatriate football managers in the United Arab Emirates